Corallus blombergi, the Ecuadorian annulated tree boa, is a boa species found in Pacific Ecuador.

Description
Medium-sized, not much is known about its natural history.

Taxonomy
Regarded as a full species, C. blombergi, by some experts, primarily due to its significantly different bone morphology, color and scalation.

References

Further reading

 Peters JA, Orejas-Miranda B. 1970. Catalogue of the Neotropical Squamata: Part 1. Snakes. Bull. U.S. Natl. Mus. 297: 1–347.

External links
 Ecuadorian Annulated Tree Boa at Corallus Dot Com. Accessed 14 July 2008.

blombergi